Hoërskool Overkruin is a public Multi-medium co-educational high school that has a strong foundation based on Christian values and ethics.

History
Originally named Hoërskool Sinoville, the school was founded on 10 June 1974. It was later renamed to Hoërskool Overkruin and had grown from 408 pupils in 1974 to 1270 by the year 2014.

Culture
Choir
Performance Arts
Photography
Public Speaking
Music
Art
First-Aid

Sport  
Athletics
Cricket
Chess
Golf
Hockey (Girls & Boys)
Mountain Bike
Netball
Rugby
Softball
Sevens Rugby
Soccer
Swimming
Table Tennis
Tennis

Headmasters
1974 - 1982 :Mnr. M.S. Mulder
1983 - 1987 :Dr. S.A.V. Coetzee
1988 - 2008 :Dr. J.M. Theunissen
2009 - Present : Mnr. P.J. Nel

Subjects
 Afrikaans Home Language
 Afrikaans First Additional Language
English Home Language
English First Additional Language
Mathematics
Mathematics Literacy
Technical Mathematics
Physical Science
Life Science
Mechanics
Engineering graphics and design
Visual Arts
Music
German
Tourism
Accounting
Robotics
Consumer Studies
Business Studies
Technology
Geography
History
Life Oriëntation
Computer Application Technology
Information Technology

External links
school website

Afrikaner culture in Pretoria
Christianity in Pretoria
Schools in Gauteng
Afrikaans-language schools
Educational institutions established in 1974
1974 establishments in South Africa